Sundbyfoss is a village in the municipality of Hof, Norway. 

Its population as of 2008 was 534.

References

Villages in Vestfold og Telemark
Hof, Vestfold